Operation Forfar was the name given to a series of British Commando raids on the French coast during World War II. The raids were part of Operation Starkey, a military deception intended to draw out the Luftwaffe. The purpose of these raids was to identify German coastal units and to gain technical intelligence on German equipment, creating the impression of pre-invasion reconnaissance.

Background
In January 1943 Allied high command put off the invasion of France until the following year, and by April had decided to focus on the Mediterranean. The newly appointed Chief of Staff to the Supreme Allied Command (COSSAC), Major-General Frederick Morgan, was directed to conduct military deception operations against western Europe, in the hope that it would tie down enemy forces during the assault on the south of the continent. The directive included explicit reference to creating fictional amphibious assaults on the French coastline, in an effort to draw out the Luftwaffe.

Morgan and John Bevan, head of the London Controlling Section (LCS), established a deception planning section of COSSAC called "Ops (B)",  under Lieutenant-Colonel J. A. Jervis-Read. The section, alongside the LCS, began outlining a plan to meet the 1943 targets. On 3 June they submitted three operations (Starkey, Wadham and Tindall), under the overall name Cockade to the Chiefs of Staff for approval.

Starkey

Operation Starkey was a threatened invasion in the Pas de Calais area of France in early September 1943, with the intention of drawing the Luftwaffe out to combat the threat, and into an air battle. As well as collecting up landing craft and other physical deception, the plan called for Commando raids on the French coast. Each raiding party was made up of around ten men, drawn from No. 10 and No. 12 Commando as well as the Special Boat Squadron. The objective within the Starkey "story" was reconnaissance for the coming invasion. To that end the raiders left behind letters for the enemy to pick up.

Both Charles Cruickshank in his book Deception in World War II and Thaddeus Holt, in his book The Deceivers state that Forfar was planned as fourteen missions, between July and September 1943 – but that only eight were carried out (One, Forfar Beer, had to be aborted three times).  In his history of 10 Commando Nick van der Bijl places the planned number at thirteen, with only 6 undertaken (one had to be aborted twice).

Raids

References

Bibliography

External links

Conflicts in 1943
World War II British Commando raids
1943 in France
Commandos (United Kingdom)
World War II deception operations